Anteholosticha is a genus of hypotrich, a group of protists.

Species 
According to the World Register of Marine Species, the following species are accepted within Anteholosticha:

 Anteholosticha arenicola (Kahl, 1932) Berger, 2003
 Anteholosticha azerbaijanica (Alekperov & Asadullayeva, 1999) Berger, 2006
 Anteholosticha eigneri Shao et al., 2009
 Anteholosticha estuarii (Borror & Wicklow, 1983) Berger, 2003
 Anteholosticha extensa (Kahl, 1932) Berger, 2003
 Anteholosticha fasciola (Kahl, 1932) Berger, 2003
 Anteholosticha gracilis (Kahl, 1932) 
 Anteholosticha longissima (Dragesco & Dragesco-Kernéis, 1986) Berger, 2006
 Anteholosticha manca (Kahl, 1932) Berger, 2003
 Anteholosticha monilata (Kahl, 1932) Berger, 2003
 Anteholosticha multistilata (Kahl, 1932) Berger, 2003
 Anteholosticha oculata (Mereschkowsky, 1877) Berger, 2003
 Anteholosticha pulchra (Kahl, 1932) Berger, 2003
 Anteholosticha scutellum (Cohn, 1866) Berger, 2006
 Anteholosticha warreni (Song & Wilbert, 1997) Berger, 2003

References 

Hypotrichea
Biota of Azerbaijan
Taxa described in 2003